The post of Leader of the Opposition in the Kerala Legislative Assembly has been held by 10 politicians since the Assembly was established in 1957. All have belonged to either the Indian National Congress, the Communist Party of India or the Communist Party of India (Marxist). The current Leader of the Opposition is V. D. Satheesan.

List of Opposition Leaders of Kerala 
Key

See also
 Kerala Council of Ministers
 Deputy Chief Ministers of Kerala
 Chief Ministers of Kerala

References

Further reading

 
 

 
Lists of people from Kerala
Leaders of the Opposition
Kerala Legislative Assembly